Electrorana is an extinct genus of frog that lived in what is now Myanmar in the Cenomanian (Upper Cretaceous) forests, 99 million years ago. The type and only species is E. limoae.

History of the discovery

A very well-preserved specimen of Electrorana was found in Myanmar inside a fragment of Burmese amber dating back to the Cretaceous period. This is an important find because the amphibians were found in particular in the tropical forests, whose humid environment prevented fossilization. Together with the frog, a beetle was also found, possibly prey of the amphibian.

Description
Although the specimen is not complete (part of the spine and a hind leg are missing) and shows a slight initial decomposition, it is very useful to science because the skeletal structure is visible even to the naked eye. It is a small frog, being about 2 cm long.

Links with current species
It has been hypothesized that Electrorana may show genetic links with living species, in particular with Alytes obstetricans.

References

Late Cretaceous animals of Asia
Fossil taxa described in 2018
Cretaceous frogs
Burmese amber
Fossils of Myanmar